The Jentink’s flying squirrel (Hylopetes platyurus) is a species of squirrel native to Indonesia and Malaysia. They are nocturnal omnivores, and have an average body mass of 131.27 mm and an average body mass of 56.98 grams.

References

Mammals described in 1890